María José Català Verdet (born 3 March 1981) is a Spanish politician who belongs to the People's Party (PP).

She was the mayor of Torrent (2007–2012), the first woman and first from her party to hold the office, and briefly served in the Congress of Deputies in 2008. She was Minister of Education in the Generalitat Valenciana from 2012 to 2015, and was elected to the Corts Valencianes in 2015 and Valencia City Council in 2019.

Biography
Born in Valencia, Català holds a degree in law from the CEU Cardinal Herrera University, and a master's degree in Business Administration. In March 2017, she received a doctorate from CEU Cardinal Herrera University. Her thesis was on the relations between voters and representatives in the early 21st century, a time of corruption scandals including several involving her party.

Catalá entered politics in 2003 when she was elected as a PP councillor for the town of Torrent to the south-west of the city of Valencia. In 2007 she was chosen as the PP candidate for mayor of Torrent and was elected  in May, becoming the first female mayor of the city. She was also its first PP mayor, ending 28 years of Spanish Socialist Workers' Party (PSOE) control, as well as being one of the youngest mayors at the time, aged 26.

In 2008, Catalá was elected to the Congress of Deputies representing the Valencia constituency after being awarded the fourth place on the PP list, virtually guaranteeing her election as the party had won at least five seats in every election from 1982 onwards. However she only served a half year in Congress, resigning in October 2008 and was replaced by Teresa García Sena.

Catalá left her post as mayor in 2012, being named Minister of Education in Alberto Fabra's Generalitat Valenciana and serving as its spokesperson for the final year before the 2015 election, in which she was elected to the Corts Valencianes. In January 2019, she was named the PP candidate for mayor of Valencia ahead of the election in May. The PP came second, and incumbent mayor Joan Ribó of Coalició Compromís was re-elected with the support of the PSOE.

References

External links
Biography at Spanish Congress website

1981 births
Living people
People from Valencia
People from Torrent, Valencia
Politicians from the Valencian Community
People's Party (Spain) politicians
Members of the 9th Congress of Deputies (Spain)
Members of the 9th Corts Valencianes
Members of the 10th Corts Valencianes
Mayors of places in the Valencian Community
Women mayors of places in Spain
City councillors in the province of Valencia
21st-century Spanish women politicians